"Heart Station" is a song by Japanese musician Hikaru Utada, which was released as a double A-side single alongside her song "Stay Gold" on February 20, 2008. The title track for her album Heart Station, the song was heavily promoted on radio stations, for three weeks it was the number one song on the newly established Billboard Hot Top Airplay chart, despite only managing to reach number two on the Billboard Japan Hot 100.

Background and development 

In February 2007, Utada released "Flavor of Life", the theme song for the drama Hana Yori Dango Returns, which became one of her most commercially successful singles, selling over eight million downloads and becoming the second most digitally successful song of 2007 globally. This was followed by a second single in 2007, featuring the songs "Beautiful World", the theme song for the animated film Evangelion: 1.0 You Are (Not) Alone, and "Kiss & Cry", a song used to promote Nissin Foods' Cup Noodles.

In October 2007, Utada's song "Stay Gold" was unveiled in Kao Corporation's Asience shampoo commercials. It was released as a ringtone on December 7, managing to be downloaded 250,000 times a month after its release, and was promoted at radio stations in mid January 2008.

During the process of writing the song, Utada decided to make the song have a theme of "heart electric waves", likening emotional signals to radio signals. She decided on this because she felt that radio stations had a hand-made, analog, loving and warm feeling to them, which resonated with the song matter.

Promotion and release 

The song was used in commercials for cellphone music store Recochoku from late January 2008, which featured Utada dancing in a bear suit fastened in the shape of her stuffed teddy bear, Kuma Chang.

Due to the radio theme of the song's lyrics, the advertising campaign for the song focused on FM radio airplay. It was released to radio stations across Japan on January 21, and a special website was created for the song in order to make it easier for people to request the song on the radio. In later February, the song reached the top of the Billboard Hot Top Airplay chart, and manage to stay there for a total of three weeks. Despite this, the song peaked only at number two on the composite Japan Hot 100 chart, behind boyband Arashi's "Step and Go".

In February, Utada went on a promotional campaign to promote the song, appearing on several music programs to perform the song: Hey! Hey! Hey! Music Champ on February 18, Music Station and Music Fighter on February 22, and at Count Down TV on February 23. She was featured in many music and fashion magazines in Japan to promote the single, including issues of Pia, Patipati, CD Data, What's In? and Pop Teen.

Music video 

The music video for the song was released on February 4, 2008. It was her first video in a year since "Flavor of Life (Ballad Version)" to feature herself personally (after animated videos were released for her other 2007 singles, "Kiss & Cry" and "Beautiful World"). The video was directed by Masashi Mutō, a director who had worked with such musical acts as Mika Nakashima and L'Arc-en-Ciel, however had not worked with Utada before.

The music video featured Utada wearing white headphones as she rides a subway train. Surrounding her are other subway users, who are immobile, and are either shown as black silhouettes or fast blurs. Mutō and Utada gave the video a theme of "gaze", and tried to focus on Utada's expressions and mannerisms as she rode among the other subway patrons.

Critical reception 

CDJournal reviewers were positive, praising in particular the song's backing vocals reusing the melody line (described as having a "tender floating-feeling"), and Utada's arrangement. They felt that the song expressed sweet, sour and painful emotions, and praised the lyric "kokoro no denpa todoitemasu ka?" ("Do my heart's radio waves reach you?") in particular as "touching the heartstrings", as if a hand were stretching out and softly touching the listener. Takayuki Saito of Hot Express felt the work established Utada further as a sound creator, and praised her vocals, lyrics and the general "high level of perfection".

Listen.jp reviewer Shigefumi Koike praised how the song showed off Utada's "adventurous spirit" while remaining an easily listenable pop song. He felt that the most notable aspect of "Heart Station" was how Utada's raw, unprocessed vocals created a strong feeling of warmth. Koike felt that both "Stay Gold" and "Heart Station" were a "magnificent" display of Utada's "futuristic" abilities as a sound creator, and that both songs showed off the emotive qualities of Utada's vocals and had great "ambient sound arrangements".

Track listing

Personnel

Personnel details were sourced from "Heart Station" / "Stay Gold"'s liner notes booklet.

Goetz B. for 365 Artists – mixing
Atsushi Matsui – recording
Akira Miyake – production
Yuzuru Tomita – additional programming
Hikaru Utada – all vocals, arrangement, keyboards, production, programming, writing
Teruzane Utada – production

Chart rankings

Weekly charts

Year-end charts

Sales and certifications

Release history

References 

2008 singles
2008 songs
EMI Music Japan singles
Hikaru Utada songs
Japanese-language songs
Songs about radio
Songs used as jingles
Songs written by Hikaru Utada